The 1960–61 Greek Football Cup was the 19th edition of the Greek Football Cup. The competition culminated with the Greek Cup Final, held at Leoforos Alexandras Stadium, on 2 July 1961. The match was contested by Olympiacos and Panionios, with Olympiacos winning by 3–0.

Calendar
From Round of 32 onwards:

Knockout phase
In the knockout phase, teams play against each other over a single match. If the match ends up as a draw, extra time will be played and if the match remains a draw a replay match is set at the home of the guest team which the extra time rule stands as well. If a winner doesn't occur after the replay match the winner emerges by a flip of a coin.

Bracket

Round of 32

||colspan="2" rowspan="12" 

||colspan="2" 
|}

*Qualified after draw.

Round of 16

|}

Quarter-finals

|}

Semi-finals

|}

Final

The 19th Greek Cup Final was played at the Leoforos Alexandras Stadium.

References

External links
Greek Cup 1960-61 at RSSSF

Greek Football Cup seasons
Greek Cup
Cup